Prakash Moosai (born 4 November 1959) is a Trinidadian cricketer and a Justice of Appeal for the Supreme Court of Judicature for Trinidad and Tobago. He played in twenty first-class and eight List A matches for Trinidad and Tobago from 1981 to 1986.

Career 
He received his LLB from the University of the West Indies, St. Augustine campus in 1979. He then obtained a Legal Education Certificate from the Hugh Wooding Law School and was called to the bar in 1981.

He spent sixteen years in private practice. He was appointed a temporary judge on 15 September 1997 and then became a permanent puisine judge of the High Court on 1 March 1998. Moosai was appointed a Justice of Appeal on 16 September 2013. He sat on the Adoption Board of Trinidad and Tobago and is on the steering committee for the drug treatment court.

Cricket career 
He was captain of the teams at St. Mary’s College and the Tunapuna Hindu Primary School. He was on the Under-19 and Senior National Teams and captain of the West Indies Lawyer’s Cricket team. Moosai is a member of the Trinidad and Tobago Cricket Board Disciplinary Committee and chairman of the Past Cricketers Society, which raises money for former cricket players facing medical problems.

See also
 List of Trinidadian representative cricketers

References

External links
 

1959 births
Living people
Trinidad and Tobago cricketers
20th-century Trinidad and Tobago judges
University of the West Indies alumni
21st-century Trinidad and Tobago judges